Prime Bank Kenya (PBKL) is a commercial bank in Kenya, licensed and supervised by the Central Bank of Kenya (CBK), the national banking regulator.

The bank is a mid-sized retail bank that caters to both individuals and corporate clients. , the bank's total asset base was valued at KES:77.998 Billion (US$784.215 Million), with shareholders' equity of KES:14.672 Billion (US$147.518 Million).

As at July 2018, Prime Bank was the 15th largest commercial bank in Kenya, out of a total of 39 lenders, based on total assets. At that time, the bank had 24,000 deposit accounts and 4,000 loan accounts, with a market share of 1.82 percent, according to data provided by CBK.

Subsidiaries
The bank investments include:

 Prime Capital & Credit Limited (PCCL) – Based in Nairobi, Kenya is owned 100% by Prime Bank (Kenya)
Tausi Assurance Company Ltd – 80.72% shareholding – An insurance company based in Kenya.
FMBCapital Holdings Plc – 22.48% shareholding, 11.24% is held directly while 11.24% through PCCL. – A Mauritius based financial services holding company with subsidiaries in Botswana, Malawi, Mozambique, Zambia and Zimbabwe.

Branch network
, the bank maintains a network of 23 interconnected branches and over 18 ATMs in Kenya's major urban centers.

Ownership
The stock of the bank is privately held. , the bank's stock was owned by the following corporate entities and individuals:

See also
 List of banks in Kenya
 Central Bank of Kenya
 Economy of Kenya

References

Banks of Kenya
Banks established in 1992
Companies based in Nairobi
Kenyan companies established in 1992